St George's Anglo- Indian Higher Secondary School was founded in 1715 as the Military (later Madras) Male Orphan Asylum and is one of the oldest schools in the world and the oldest in India. It is affiliated to the Anglo-Indian Board of Education.

It is situated in the heart of the city in Shenoy Nagar, a bustling area in Chennai, Tamil Nadu, India. The school provides education to over 1500 children from nursery up to the +2 level. It has a library, NCC and a computer centre. There are 36 staff members led by the Head Master and the Correspondent.

Education 
St Georges Anglo-Indian Higher Secondary School [Charitable Trust], is committed to imparting the wealth of knowledge through education to students from diverse cultural and socio-economic backgrounds; thereby presenting a platform of equal opportunity to develop and succeed. Over 1500 boys and girls from K-12 are nurtured and equipped with strong skills and values desired to take on this competitive world. A collaborative teaching method combined with a perfect balance of academic and extra-curricular learning, sets the standard for a world class education.

Hockey 
St George's  has one of the best school hockey teams in Chennai. It has also produced many players who have represented Tamil Nadu and India at various levels.

Mr. Jason, the hockey coach of the school, trained the team. He had trained the school team for more than 28 years and his legacy lives on after his sad demise in 2012.  St. Georges school had the best hockey team in Chennai and were consistent winners for years together in the sub junior, junior, senior and super senior categories under his coaching. The school has no sports activity and most of the play area have been transformed into  rental parking and wedding reception centers.

Library 
St George's  library has rare books from the 18th century to date.

Heritage Structure 
The chapel and the classroom block of the school are part of CMDA's 400 recognized heritage structures in the city.

Controversies

Child Sex Abuse Case 
In 18 June 2009 there were news reports that a UK volunteer was "misbehaving" with students. A four member UK detective team probed this but the evidences started to go missing including the whistle-blower, victims and videotape statements.

Fee structure increase 
In June 2012 there were news reports of increase in fee structure which was not in conformance with the fee structure set by Anglo-Indian Board, further to this there were protest by parents which resulted in ten parents being arrested and later released by Chennai Police. It's confirmed that the fees collected in St. George's is the lowest in all Anglo Indian schools in India.

Public events 
There were further allegations about school premises being misused for public events and other private events (including movie audio releases), although school principal R. Paul Victor Samuel maintained that these allegations were baseless.

On 6 September 2018 the Hon’ble High Court of Madras passed an ad-interim injunction against the school restraining them from carrying out any business activities / commercial activities in its playground / vacant site in WMP.No.21682/2018 pending disposal of the writ petition WP.No.18737/2018.

Renovation of old structure 
The Manorial Conway House, a century old building in the school campus was renovated and resulted in concerns from heritage activists. The school correspondent Mr. G.K. Francis clarified that part of the building had to be renovated since it was not safe for the children. He also clarified that only the Chapel was part of the heritage structure listed by CMDA and others are not and does not require permission from CMDA.

Tercentenary celebrations 

St George's school's tercentenary celebrations were held between 23 April 2015 and 25 April 2015, the celebrations included sporting activities including old and new students, a carnival and a Christmas dance. There was also an on-stage performance from the band called "Second Coming" (St George's alumni).

These celebrations (called "Georgian reunion") brought many old students back to the campus, the sporting activities included hockey, football and cricket for men and throw ball for women.

References

Primary schools in Tamil Nadu
High schools and secondary schools in Chennai
Educational institutions established in 1715
1710s establishments in India
1715 establishments in the British Empire